The polar see-saw (also: bipolar seesaw) is the phenomenon that temperature changes in the northern and southern hemispheres may be out of phase. The hypothesis states that large changes, for example when the glaciers are intensely growing or depleting, in the formation of ocean bottom water in both poles take a long time to exert their effect in the other hemisphere. Estimates of the period of delay vary; one typical estimate is 1,500 years. This is usually studied in the context of ice cores taken from Antarctica and Greenland.

See also 
Polar amplification
Climate of the Arctic
Climate of Antarctica

References 

Meteorological phenomena
Environment of Antarctica
Climate and weather statistics